El Pla de Santa Maria is a municipality in the comarca of the Alt Camp in Catalonia, Spain. It is situated at the foot of the Miramar range. The municipality is served the A-2 autopista and is linked to Valls by the T-200 road.

References

 Panareda Clopés, Josep Maria; Rios Calvet, Jaume; Rabella Vives, Josep Maria (1989). Guia de Catalunya, Barcelona: Caixa de Catalunya.  (Spanish).  (Catalan).

External links
Official website 
 Government data pages 

Municipalities in Alt Camp
Populated places in Alt Camp